Charles Flynn may refer to:

 Charles L. Flynn, Jr., president of the College of Mount Saint Vincent
 Charles Flynn (trade unionist) (1882–1957), British trade unionist and politician
 Charles A. Flynn, United States Army general
 Charlie Flynn (born 1993), an amateur boxer from Scotland